Adolf Zimmer (28 February 1908 – May 1940) was a Polish footballer. He played in one match for the Poland national football team in 1934. His club was Pogon Lwow.

A lieutenant in the Polish Army, he was imprisoned by the NKVD following the Soviet invasion of Poland in 1939 and was killed in the Katyn Massacre in May 1940 aged 32.

References

External links
 

1908 births
1940 deaths
Polish footballers
Poland international footballers
Association footballers not categorized by position
Polish military personnel killed in World War II
Katyn massacre victims